Barry O'Neill (born 1 January 1946) is an Irish sailor. He competed in the Flying Dutchman event at the 1976 Summer Olympics.

References

External links
 

1946 births
Living people
Irish male sailors (sport)
Olympic sailors of Ireland
Sailors at the 1976 Summer Olympics – Flying Dutchman
Place of birth missing (living people)